The scarlet-thighed dacnis (Dacnis venusta) is a tanager 4¾" long. It is found in Costa Rica, Colombia, Ecuador and Panama.

Description
Iris bright red in male, duller red in female. Male unmistakable with bright turquoise blue crown and nape, sides of head and neck, centre of back, rump and scapulars.; forehead lores, sides of back, wings and tail, and mid-throat and entire remaining underparts black; the thighs are scarlet, but these are usually hidden. Female dull greenish blue above, brightest on cheeks, scapulars, and rump, duskier on back, wings, and tail; below dingy buffy greyish, buffiest on belly and undertail coverts.

References

Further reading

External links
drawing
picture of a male
a small picture of a male showing his 'scarlet thighs'

Dacnis
Birds described in 1862